Frederick Bethune Bartlett (August 23, 1882 – December 15, 1941) was an American prelate who served as the eighth Bishop of Idaho from 1935 till 1941.

Early life and education
Bartlett was born on August 23, 1882, in Manchester, Connecticut, the son of Bethune James Bartlett and Elizabeth Johnson. In 1904 he graduated with a Bachelor of Arts from Trinity College, Connecticut. Year later, in 1932, he was awarded the Doctor of Divinity by the same college. He enrolled in the Episcopal Theological Seminary and graduated with a Bachelor of Divinity in 1908. In 1911 he graduated with a Master of Arts from Harvard University.

Priesthood
Bartlett was ordained deacon in 1908 by Bishop Chauncey B. Brewster of Connecticut and priest that same year by Charles Scadding, Bishop of Oregon. His first post was as a missionary priest in Grants Pass, Oregon. In 1911 he became vicar of Christ Chapel in Brooklyn, New York City. In 1917 he transferred to West Hoboken, New Jersey, to serve as rector of St John's Church. A year later he became rector of St Mark's Church in Aberdeen, South Dakota, where he remained till 1923 when he became rector of St Philip the Apostle Church in  St. Louis, Missouri. In 1925 he was appointed general secretary of the National Council of the Protestant Episcopal Church.

Bishop
Bartlett was elected as Bishop of North Dakota on September 25, 1931. He was consecrated on December 16, 1931, by Hugh L. Burleson of South Dakota. In 1935 he was elected Bishop of Idaho, where he reminded till his death in 1941.

Family
Touret was married to Jessie Langelle Hale on October 10, 1911.

References

1882 births
1941 deaths
Episcopal bishops of Idaho
People from Manchester, Connecticut
Trinity College (Connecticut) alumni
Episcopal Divinity School alumni
Harvard University alumni
20th-century American Episcopalians
Episcopal bishops of North Dakota